Mvimbi  is a South African surname that may refer to
Lulama Mvimbi is a South African politician
Samkelo Mvimbi (b. 1999) is a South African field hockey player
Owen Mvimbi (b. 1988)  is a South African field hockey player

See also 
 Albert Luthuli also known by his Zulu name Mvumbi